Claddagh can refer to:

Places
 Claddagh, Galway, part of Galway city centre, Ireland, formerly a fishing village on the old city outskirts
 Claddagh River, a river in County Cavan, Ireland

Other uses
 Claddagh Records, a record label
 Claddagh ring, a traditional friendship or wedding ring that originated in the Claddagh village